The 1987–88 Divizia A was the seventieth season of Divizia A, the top-level football league of Romania.

Teams

League table

Positions by round

Results

Top goalscorers

Champion squad

See also 

 1987–88 Divizia B

References

Liga I seasons
Romania
1987–88 in Romanian football